Cheddikulam is a small town in Sri Lanka. It is located within Northern Province.

Transport
Cheddikulam railway station

See also
List of towns in Northern Province, Sri Lanka

References

External links

 
Towns in Vavuniya District
Venkalacheddikulam DS Division